The 2021 Hastings Deering Colts season was the 4th season of the under-21 competition, sponsored by Hastings Deering and run by the Queensland Rugby League. The draw and structure of the competition mirrors that of its senior counterpart, the Queensland Cup. 

The Sunshine Coast Falcons are the defending premiers, having won the competition in 2019 as the 2020 competition was cancelled due the COVID-19 pandemic.

Teams
In 2021, the lineup of teams remains unchanged for the second consecutive year.

Ladder

Final series
Source:

References

2021 in Australian rugby league